Alexander "Alex" Comninos  served as the President of the Scouts of Greece from 1991 to 1995.

In 1996, Comninos was awarded the 247th Bronze Wolf, the only distinction of the World Organization of the Scout Movement, awarded by the World Scout Committee for exceptional services to world Scouting.

See also 

Komnenos

References

External links
complete list

https://web.archive.org/web/20161028215017/http://photoarc.sep.org.gr/displayimage-1211.htmlalbums/userpics/displayimage-38-1122.html

Recipients of the Bronze Wolf Award
Year of birth missing
Scouting and Guiding in Greece